Michael Ritch (born February 24, 1973) is an American stock car racing driver who competed in 47 races across NASCAR's top three series between 1992 and 2002. He also competed in 165 Rev-Oil Pro Cup Series races between 1998 and 2009, winning 15 races and the 2007 Southern Division Championship.

Early career
Ritch began his racing career when he was 9 years old when he raced BMX bikes. He would eventually move to late model race cars. At age 19, he won both the track championship at Ace Speedway in Elon, North Carolina and the regional Mid-Atlantic Championship in 1992, winning 14 of his 44 starts.

NASCAR career

Winston Cup Series
Ritch made his only career Winston Cup start at Dover International Speedway in 1995. He would finish 34th in the 40-car field, falling out of the race just before the halfway mark after an engine failure..

Busch Series
Ritch made sporadic Busch Series starts between 1992 and 1999, often on short tracks in Virginia and The Carolinas. During this time he made 18 starts with a best finish of 9th coming at Orange County Speedway in 1994.

In 2000, Ritch got an opportunity to run a full schedule, driving the No. 55 Ford for Davis & Weight Motorsports. The season was a disappointment as Ritch failed to qualify 11 times in 32 attempts, had only one lead lap finish, and finished 33rd in the standings. He also finished in the top 20 only five times that season, with a best finish of 13th at Talladega, and also led five laps at Gateway. His best showing that season came at South Boston Speedway when he was fastest in practice and qualified 3rd for the race, but finished 25th after a rear gear problem late in the race. After the season, Ritch was released and never attempted another Busch Series race after that.

Craftsman Truck Series
After being released from his Busch Series ride, Ritch drove a limited schedule in the Craftsman Truck Series for Ware Racing Enterprises in 2001. He made seven starts for the team in a 2-year period, with a best finish of 16th coming at Gateway in 2001.

USAR Pro Cup Series
Ritch competed in the USAR Pro Cup Series both before and after his tenure in NASCAR, between 1998 and 2009. In that period he made 165 starts with 15 wins (including seven in 1998), 9 poles, and winning the series' Southern Division Championship in 2007. He followed up his championship campaign with a runner-up finish the year after, before switching teams and only running a partial schedule in 2009. He made his final series start at Concord Speedway on September 5, 2009.

Motorsports career results

NASCAR
(key) (Bold – Pole position awarded by qualifying time. Italics – Pole position earned by points standings or practice time. * – Most laps led.)

Winston Cup Series

References

External links
 

Living people
1973 births
Sportspeople from High Point, North Carolina
Racing drivers from North Carolina
NASCAR drivers
CARS Tour drivers